KBS World Radio (Korean: KBS 월드라디오; formerly Radio Korea and Radio Korea International) is the official international broadcasting station of South Korea. Owned by the Korean Broadcasting System, the station broadcasts news and information in 11 languages: Korean, English, Chinese, Japanese, Indonesian, Arabic, Vietnamese, Russian, German, French and Spanish.

English-language Programs

See also 
 KBS, South Korea's premier public broadcaster
 KBS World

References

External links 
 

International broadcasters
World Radio
Radio stations established in 1953
Radio stations in South Korea
1953 establishments in South Korea